Juan Manso de Contreras  (?? – 1671) was the Governor of New Mexico between 1656  and 1659.

Early life 
Juan Manso de Contreras was born in la Villa de Loarca, Consejo de Valdes, in Oviedo (Asturias, Spain). He lived in Sevilla  (Andalusia, Spain). Juan Manso was the younger half-brother of Fray Tomás Manso. Fray Manso was the bishop of Nicaragua. This led to  good relations with the Franciscans.

Career 

Around 1652,  Juan and Tomás Manso traveled to New Spain on a mission. This mission supplied caravans from Mexico City to Santa Fe, New Mexico. In 1656 he  began working with the mission supply train wagons.

Juan Manso was appointment Governor of Santa Fe de Nuevo México in 1656.
He issued legislation against the Pueblo Native Americans, because of his religion. Contreras created many enemies among the Spanish settlers of New Mexico. One of them was the Soldier Francisco de Anaya Almazán (who occupied several importants charges in the military and administrative areas). Anaya was jailed, although he escaped with the help of Pedro Lucero de Godoy and Francisco Gómez de Robledo, children of Francisco Gomes. The reasons of imprisonment of Anaya are unknown.

Manso was replaced by Bernardo López de Mendizábal in the New Mexico government in 1656. 
 
After that, Contreras moved to Mexico City, where he lived until 1661. In that year, he traveled to New Mexico to drive the imprisonment of Governor of New Mexico Bernardo López de Mendizabal, following an order from the Inquisition. Mendizabal was arrested in the spring of 1663 and Contreras moved to Parral, in New Vizcaya, where he supplied wagons, work in which he excelled. He continued until his death in 1671.

Personal life 
Contreras married Maria de Medina. They had one son named Francisco Manso de Contreras. Francisco worked as Contator of Venezuela and married to María Ramírez Monge o de Bejarano.

References 

Colonial governors of Santa Fe de Nuevo México
People from Asturias
1569 births
1671 deaths